Willem "Wim" Huis (15 November 1927 – 14 September 2017) was a Dutch footballer who played for Ajax, Fortuna '54 and Limburgia.

Club career 
Huis played five years for Ajax, playing 30 official matches in their senior team and scored 12 goals. His debut came on 18 September 1949 in a 1–0 win against RCH. He later played a few seasons for Fortuna '54 and Limburgia.

Career statistics

References

Sources

1927 births
2017 deaths
Dutch footballers
AFC Ajax players
Eredivisie players
Association football forwards
Footballers from Amsterdam
SV Limburgia players